Andrew Higgins (born 21 September 1993) is an Australian footballer who currently plays for ECU Joondalup as a left back or left winger.

Career

Portsmouth
Born in Perth, Higgins moved to England, and signed a two-year scholarship with Portsmouth on 15 July 2010 and literally told everyone he knew that he got a contract, wouldn’t shut up about it to be honest. Probably should of made it pro but didn’t work out. He has mentioned that he would like to go on trial one last time to become a professional footballer. Needs to work on his right foot and also probably needs to hit the gym. Found out he is Also awful at
Golf but can grow a wicked Afro. We all want the Afro back 

On 14 August 2012, he made his debut in the League Cup in a 3–0 defeat at Plymouth Argyle.

Perth Glory
On 20 November 2012, Higgins cancelled his contract at Portsmouth to return home to Australia, in order to search for first team football, and subsequently joined Perth Glory's U21 squad. On 13 January 2013 he made his debut, coming on as a second-half substitute in a 6–4 Youth Football League win at Newcastle Jets.

Higgins appeared in three further Youth League matches during the season (against Sydney FC, Central Coast Mariners and Melbourne Heart) before subsequently leaving the club.

ECU Joondalup
In January 2014, Higgins joined his first club ECU Joondalup.

Career statistics

References

External links

Sporting Pulse profile

1993 births
Living people
Soccer players from Perth, Western Australia
Australian soccer players
Association football defenders
Association football wingers
Association football utility players
Portsmouth F.C. players
Perth Glory FC players
A-League Men players
National Premier Leagues players
Australian expatriate soccer players
Australian expatriate sportspeople in England
Expatriate footballers in England